The Island of San Michele is an island in the Venetian Lagoon, Veneto, northern Italy.  It is associated with the sestiere of Cannaregio, from which it lies a short distance northeast.

History
Along with neighbouring San Cristoforo della Pace, the island was a popular place for local travellers and fishermen  to land.  Mauro Codussi's Chiesa di San Michele in Isola of 1469, the first Renaissance church in Venice, and a monastery lie on the island, which also served for a time  as a prison.

San Cristoforo was selected to become a cemetery in 1807, designed by Gian Antonio Selva, when under French occupation it was decreed that burial on the mainland (or on the main Venetian islands) was unsanitary.  The canal that separated the two islands was filled in during 1836, and subsequently the larger island became known as San Michele. Bodies were carried to the island on special funeral gondolas. The cemetery is still in use today.

The cemetery contains 7 war graves from World War I of officers and seamen of the British merchant and Royal Navy.

Princess Aspasia Manos, the wife of King Alexander of Greece, was initially interred at the cemetery of Isola di San Michele. Her remains were later transferred to the royal cemetery plot in the park of Tatoi Palace near Athens.

Other attractions include the Cappella Emiliana chapel.

Burials
Those buried on the Island of San Michele include:
 Catherine Bagration (1783–1857), princess and beauty
 Franco Basaglia (1924–1980), psychiatrist
 Joseph Brodsky (1940–1996), poet and essayist
 Horatio Brown (1854–1926), historian
 Roberto Calasso (1941–2021), writer and publisher
 Ashley Clarke (1903–1994), diplomat 
 Antonio Dal Zòtto (1841–1918), sculptor
 Salvador de Iturbide y Marzán (1849–1895), grandson of first emperor of independent Mexico
 Sergei Diaghilev (1872–1929), ballet impresario
 Christian Doppler (1803–1853), mathematician and physicist
 Helenio Herrera (1910–1997), footballer
 Zoran Mušič (1909–2005), painter and printmaker
 Luigi Nono (1924–1990), composer
 Ezra Pound (1885–1972), poet and critic
 Frederick Rolfe (1860–1913), writer
 Olga Rudge (1895–1996), violinist
 Jean Schlumberger (1907–1987), jewelry designer 
 Igor Stravinsky (1882–1971), composer
 Guido Toffoletti (1951–1999), musician
 Emilio Vedova (1919–2006), painter

Gallery

See also
 List of islands of Italy

References

External links

 

Geography of Venice
 
Cemeteries in Italy
San Michele